Gamora is a character appearing in American comic books published by Marvel Comics. Created by writer/artist Jim Starlin, the character first appeared in Strange Tales #180 (June 1975). Gamora is the adopted daughter of Thanos, and the last of her species. Her powers include superhuman strength and agility and an accelerated healing factor. She also is an elite combatant, being able to beat most of the opponents in the galaxy. She is a member of the superhero group known as the Infinity Watch. The character played a role in the 2007 crossover storyline "Annihilation: Conquest", becoming a member of the titular team in its spin-off comic, Guardians of the Galaxy, before becoming the supervillain Requiem in the 2018 crossover storylines "Infinity Countdown" and "Infinity Wars".

Gamora has been featured in a variety of associated Marvel merchandise. Zoe Saldaña plays the character in the Marvel Cinematic Universe films Guardians of the Galaxy (2014), Guardians of the Galaxy Vol. 2 (2017), and Avengers: Infinity War (2018), additionally portraying a version of the character from an alternate timeline in Avengers: Endgame (2019) and the upcoming film Guardians of the Galaxy Vol. 3 (2023). Ariana Greenblatt portrayed a young Gamora in Avengers: Infinity War.

Publication history
The character debuted in Strange Tales #180 (1975), and was created by Jim Starlin. She returned in issue #181, Warlock #9, 10, 11 and 15 (1975-1976), and in the 1977 annuals for The Avengers and Marvel Two-in-One. In 1990, she returned in Silver Surfer vol. 3 #46-47. She had a minor role in The Infinity Gauntlet #1-6 (1991) and co-starred in Warlock and the Infinity Watch #1-42 (1992-1995). She was also featured in the Infinity War (1992) and Infinity Crusade (1993) crossovers. After appearing in Infinity Abyss #1-6 (2002), Annihilation: Ronan #1-4 (2006), Annihilation #1-6 (2006), Annihilation: Conquest #6 (2008) and Nova vol. 4 #4-12 (2007-2008), Gamora costarred in Guardians of the Galaxy vol. 2 #1-25 (2008-2010). She played a minor role in The Thanos Imperative #1-6 (2010).

The character, along with the other Guardians, appears in Avengers Assemble issues #4-8 (2012). She stars in Guardians of the Galaxy vol. 3, a part of the Marvel NOW! relaunch, and in Guardians of the Galaxy vol. 4. Parts of her origin story were told in a 2017 series titled Gamora that lasted five issues and were collected into the graphic novel Gamora: Memento Mori (2017). While being set on Earth-616, it retcons some elements of the established continuity to match the movie version.

Fictional character biography
Gamora is the last of her species, the Zen-Whoberis, who were exterminated by the Badoon (in her original timeline, her species was exterminated by the Universal Church of Truth). Thanos found her as a child and decided to use her as a weapon. Gamora was raised and trained by Thanos to assassinate the Magus, the evil, future version of Adam Warlock. Thanos showed her little kindness during her childhood, but Gamora was very loyal to the man who promised her the opportunity to avenge the death of her family. Gamora became very proficient in martial arts, earning the nickname "The deadliest woman in the whole galaxy". When she was a teenager, Thanos took her on a trip to Tartoonla #7. Gamora disobeyed Thanos's orders, and due to this, came into conflict with a group of thugs. She was greatly outnumbered, and despite her skills, she was defeated and then raped by the assailants. Thanos found her half dead, and in turn, murdered all of her assailants and restored her to health, cybernetically enhancing her to superhuman levels.

As an adult, Gamora was sent as an assassin against the Universal Church of Truth, quickly becoming feared by its agents, the Black Knights. She exacted revenge for the genocide of her race by killing every member of the church involved before the event actually occurred. Gamora met and teamed up with Adam Warlock, who wanted to stop his future, evil self. She even managed to get close to the Magus but failed her assassination in the last second. Together with Warlock, Pip the Troll and Thanos, Gamora fought to escape the Black Knights of the Universal Church of Truth and Magus's Death Squad. She was then assigned by Thanos to protect Adam Warlock, but she became suspicious of Thanos's plans, and was then attacked by Drax the Destroyer.

Eventually the Magus was defeated, but Thanos revealed himself as an even-greater threat. Gamora aided Captain Mar-Vell, Drax, and the Avengers against Thanos. Gamora and Pip tried to prevent Thanos from destroying half of all the life in the universe. Gamora attempted to slay Thanos, but he mortally wounded her, and destroyed Pip's mind. Adam Warlock found them, and Gamora warned Adam of Thanos's plans, and Adam absorbed their souls into his Soul Gem. When Adam Warlock died as well, his spirit was reunited with that of his friends in "Soulworld" within the Soul Gem.

Infinity Watch

Inside the Soul Gem was Soulworld, a place where Gamora, Pip and eventually Adam Warlock himself lived at peace. Other beings who had been absorbed by the Soul Gem, such as Kray-Tor and Autolycus, also lived in peace with former enemies.

Gamora met the Silver Surfer when he traveled to "Soulworld", and also battled Drax the Destroyer.

When Thanos managed to obtain all the Infinity Gems, forming the Infinity Gauntlet, Adam Warlock decided that he must be stopped. Warlock led Gamora and Pip the Troll out of Soulworld into the real world. Their souls took over the bodies of three humans, who had recently died in a car crash. Gamora thus returned to the corporeal world by taking possession of the body of Bambi Long, whose body then began transforming into a duplicate of Gamora's original body. However, Gamora was soon erased from existence by Thanos when he erased half the population in the universe. When Nebula claimed the Gauntlet from Thanos, Gamora returned to existence.

Warlock now had the Infinity Gauntlet, giving him near omnipotence. Gamora and Pip persuaded Doctor Strange to help them find and stop Warlock, who was going mad with power. The Living Tribunal intervened and Warlock divided the Infinity Gems among several guardians, known as the Infinity Watch. Gamora received the Time Gem, but was incapable of consciously using it, though it did give her sporadic precognitive dreams and visions. Gamora had become romantically interested in Adam, but Adam did not respond to her. In an argument over the Infinity Watch member Maxam, Gamora left the Infinity Watch and the Time Gem behind. She returned to work as a mercenary until Adam Warlock approached her again. They continued to travel together and eventually Adam reciprocated her love. Adam and Gamora remained in a pocket dimension to raise the cosmic being known as Atleza.

Annihilation

Gamora later reappears in the pages of Ronan, having left the company of Adam Warlock and settled on the world Godthab Omega as leader of a group of female warriors called The Graces, where her mind has been altered by Glorian. She is intent on re-establishing her reputation as the deadliest woman in the universe and now wields a powerful blade known as Godslayer. At one point, she is seen reclining on a 'throne' made of corpses. She joins the United Front, using her skills to launch quick counterattacks against the Annihilation Wave. She engages in a sexual relationship with the United Front's leader, Nova.

During the Phalanx's invasion of the Kree home-world following the Annihilation War, Gamora is assimilated as a "select" of the hive mind. They dispatch her to apprehend Nova after he flees the planet. She is later freed by Nova and the Technarch Tyro, but left in severe distress, longing again for the sense of companionship brought by the Phalanx, and continuing to adopt her Phalanx mannerisms.

She joins the new Guardians of the Galaxy.

Gamora was taken prisoner by Magus when he faked the death of himself and several other Guardians. She was rescued by Star-Lord and played a minor role in the war with the "Cancerverse".

She later appears on Earth to aid the Avengers against Thanos.

During the Original Sin storyline, Gamora was seen with Moon Knight and Winter Soldier's group when they do their investigation on who murdered Uatu the Watcher.

Countdown to Infinity
Later, Gamora was confronted in her dreams by an elderly version of herself who turned out to be a part of her which had remained trapped in the Soul Stone after she left its internal paradise. This gave Gamora a motivation to recover the Soul Stone at whatever cost. When the Guardians of the Galaxy find the Power Stone, Gamora pleads with Star-Lord to let her use the Stone so she could get the Soul Stone and recover the piece of her soul trapped within it. Quill refuses and Gamora leaves him with a parting kiss.

Infinity Wars
After experiencing reoccurring dreams concerning encounters with an older version of herself, Gamora came to the realization that a portion of her soul remained trapped inside the Soul World. Determined to set it free, Gamora set out to find the Soul Gem. To this end, she located Grandmaster and made a deal with him to perform missions for him with the Guardians of the Galaxy in exchange for information, hoping to find about the Soul Gem this way. When carrying a heist on the Collector's collection, Tivan agreed to help Gamora in her mission. He made a deal with Gamora, offering his assistance in stealing the Soul Gem if it turned out the Grandmaster possessed it, in exchange for the Infinity Gem Gamora bluffed about possessing.

When the Collector interrupted the Guardians' rendezvous with their client, the Grandmaster revealed he had challenged his brother just to test him. The Collector and the Grandmaster learned that some of their fellow Elders were mysteriously altered or gone, and determined they could be linked to the disappearance of the Infinity Stones. Since helping the Grandmaster and the Collector gather the stones aligned with her plans, Gamora convinced her teammates to embark on a quest to find them. After helping the Nova Corps defend the Power Stone which had manifested in the planet Xitaung, the Guardians took off with it to Oblitus. They were approached by Adam Warlock and Kang the Conqueror, who had joined forces to find the Time Stone and already had the Soul Gem in their possession. Gamora attempted to force Warlock to hand over the Soul Gem, and a fight broke out. During the battle, Drax managed to hold it, but was exposed to the corruption of Soulworld. He struck Gamora to prevent her from opening the gem, and departed with Warlock and Kang. In addition to Drax's betrayal, the other Guardians refused to follow Gamora into pursuing Kang. Outraged by her teammates' behavior, Gamora left them to obtain the Soul Gem on her own. To help her quest, Gamora kidnapped a master forge-smith from Nidavellir and forced him to make her an armor, killing him afterwards. She later agreed a parley with Star-Lord to steal the Power Stone from him, by switching it with a fake without him noticing, and encrusted the hilt of her Infinity Blade with it. Sporting her masked armor and the encrusted sword, Gamora attacked Thanos before he could set out to gather the Infinity Stones to prevent his interference. After being felled, Thanos remarked that Gamora was going to conduct his requiem. Despite brushing off her father's comment and killing him, Gamora decided to adopt that word as her new alias, and became known as Requiem. After murdering Thanos, Gamora started being plagued by apparitions of him. Requiem subsequently interrupted a conclave of the new Infinity Watch to steal the Infinity Stones, and her true identity was quickly revealed to her former allies. Star-Lord was surprised by Gamora's uncharacteristic behavior, and she tried to kill him, he was only saved by the intervention of Doctor Strange using the Time Stone. As the conflict continued, Gamora managed to get her hands on the Reality Stone, and quickly claimed the remaining Stones from their owners. Encouraged by Thanos' apparition, Gamora hesitantly opened a portal to the Soul Gem and reunited with the fragment of herself, becoming whole again. She then set out to rebalance the Soul Gem.

To prevent opposition from her quest and to feed the being Devondra, who was responsible for the Soul Gem's hungering for souls, Gamora used the Infinity Stones to fold the universe in half and merge the two halves together before sending the new universe into a pocket dimension called Warp World inside the Soul Gem. Gamora planned to create a reality once Devondra devoured all the souls and ensure that suffering no longer existed in this new universe. She also sealed Loki into the Soul Gem when he asked to be her counsel. Gamora and Loki's companion Flowa then traveled to the God Quarry so Gamora could investigate what laid beneath it as she couldn't see past it. Even with the Infinity Stones, Gamora was unable to breach the barrier at the bottom of the God Quarry. After fending alternate reality versions of Captain Marvel and Moondragon, Gamora was confronted by Loki and his newly assembled Cosmic Avengers who had managed to escape the Soul Gem. Wielding copies of the Infinity Stones Gamora unintentionally created when she created Warp World, the Cosmic Avengers easily subdued Gamora and took the Infinity Stones from her. However, Loki used his sorcery to take control of Gamora's Infinity Stones and used them to send her and the alternate reality Phyla-Vell and Moondragon to Warp World before transporting himself to the unknown realm that existed beneath the God Quarry. While in Warp World, Gamora was clobbered by Soldier Supreme and nearly consumed by Devondra but was rescued by Peet, the fusion of Star-Lord and Groot. The Cosmic Avengers eventually returned with the Infinity Stones after Loki relinquished them. With Adam Warlock's help, the Cosmic Avengers restored the universe while also allowing Warp World to remain in existence. They then fled Soul World using the Soul Gem with Gamora, Star-Lord, Groot, Rocket Raccoon, Moondragon, and Phyla-Vell, but Drax had to stay behind to keep the portal opened. They arrived on Earth and crash-landed in Egypt. Phyla-Vell and Moondragon wanted to punish Gamora for destroying their universe, even though that was the work of a different Gamora. Adam Warlock decided to send Gamora to a random location using the Infinity Stones to redeem herself. Gamora ended up on an unknown planet with a resurrected Magus.

She is later seen raising Magus, and still being plagued by Thanos apparition. Thanos tells her that he will not be dead for long.

The Final Gauntlet
When it was learned from Thanos' will that he plans to resurrect himself by uploading his consciousness into an unrevealed being, many assumed it was Gamora. So, Gamora's uncle Starfox formed the Dark Guardians to prevent this. Gamora was on Halfworld at the time keeping an eye on ex-Guardian Rocket. She was later picked up by the Guardians to protect her from harm. However, the Dark Guardians followed Gamora's ex-lover Nova, knowing that he would search for her and warn her of their intent. Once Nova found Gamora, the Dark Guardians attacked Nova and the Guardians, forcing them to crash-land on an unnamed planet. After subduing the Guardians and Nova, the Dark Guardians took Gamora prisoner.

As the Dark Guardians were about to kill Gamora, they were attacked by the Asgardian death goddess Hela and the Black Order who planned to resurrect Thanos. Hela then revealed that Thanos planned to come back in Starfox's body, not Gamora's. Thanos' consciousness took control of Starfox shortly after. When the Guardians arrived to rescue Gamora, they found Gamora surrounded by the Dark Guardians, who explained what happened.

Gamora rejoined the Guardians who with the remaining Dark Guardians attacked Hela's hideout in Knowhere to stop Thanos' resurrection. While Thanos was transferring his consciousness from Starfox's body into his, Gamora stabbed Starfox with a sword to stop it. However, this only caused Thanos to be brought back with a broken mind. When Thanos was accidentally hit with a missile that generated a black hole, Thanos, Hela, and Knowhere were sucked up while the Guardians and Dark Guardians escaped.

Powers and abilities
Gamora received treatments from Thanos that enhanced her speed, strength, agility, and durability to rival Adam Warlock's (to better slay the Magus, his evil, future self). Thanos also helped her become a formidable hand-to-hand combatant, trained in the martial-arts techniques from various planets, in the uses of the known weaponry of the Milky Way galaxy, and stealth techniques. She is also a highly skilled gymnast and assassin, and formerly possessed a telepathic link to Thanos. She uses a wide variety of weaponry, most notably a dagger whose unknown properties made it capable of slaying even beings of such immense power as Thanos and the Magus.

In the pages of Infinity Watch, it is revealed that Gamora had been cybernetically enhanced to have superhuman strength, speed, and a rapid-healing ability. Gamora's strength and speed were further enhanced by Adam Warlock when they returned from Soulworld.

Gamora possesses a regenerative healing factor, allowing her to recover more quickly.

Gamora is one of the most skilled martial artists in the Marvel Universe. She is capable of defeating opponents who possess superhuman strength and durability that far surpass her own, and she has defeated a military platoon containing dozens of combat-trained men in only a few minutes. She has learned to paralyze or kill opponents using vital-point strikes directed at certain nerve clusters. Although skilled in the use of most conventional weapons, she prefers to use knives and swords.

While Gamora was with the Infinity Watch, she possessed the Infinity Gem called the "Time Gem". The gem was mentally linked to her, giving her the potential power to control time. She said that she did not know how to employ its powers and preferred not to use it. While she possessed the Time Gem, Gamora was prone to precognitive dreams and visions, though she had no conscious control over them. Later, despite no longer possessing the gem, she was claimed to retain some measure of this capability at the time of the Phalanx conquest.

Reception

Accolades 

 In 2018, CBR.com ranked Gamora 18th in their "25 Most Powerful Guardians Of The Galaxy" list and 19th in their "20 Guardians Of The Galaxy Members Ranked From Weakest To Strongest" list.
 In 2019, Daily Mirror ranked Gamora 13th in their "Best female superheroes of all time" list.
 In 2019, CBR.com ranked Gamora 1st in their "10 Daughters Of Marvel Supervillains That Are More Dangerous Than Their Parents" list.
 In 2020, Scary Mommy ranked Gamer 3rd in their "Looking For A Role Model? These 195+ Marvel Female Characters Are Truly Heroic" list.
 In 2020, CBR.com ranked Gamora 2nd in their "15 Strongest Swordfighters In Marvel Comics" list 
 In 2021, CBR.com ranked Gamora 18th in their "20 Strongest Female Superheroes" list.
 In 2022, The A.V. Club ranked Gamora 31st in their "100 best Marvel characters" list.
 In 2022, CBR.com ranked Gamora 5th in their "10 Best Cosmic Heroes in Marvel Comics" list.

In other media

Television

 Gamora appears in Silver Surfer, voiced initially by Mary Long and later by Alison Sealy-Smith. 
 Gamora appears in Ultimate Spider-Man, voiced by Nika Futterman. This version is a member of the Guardians of the Galaxy.
 Gamora appears in Avengers Assemble, voiced again by Nika Futterman (in "Guardians and Spaceknights") and Laura Bailey (in "Widow's Run"). This version is a member of the Guardians of the Galaxy.
 Gamora appears in Hulk and the Agents of S.M.A.S.H., voiced again by Nika Futterman. This version is a member of the Guardians of the Galaxy.
 Gamora appears in Marvel Disk Wars: The Avengers, voiced by Masato Funaki.
 Gamora appears in Guardians of the Galaxy, voiced by Vanessa Marshall. This version is a member of the titular team.
 Gamora appears in Lego Marvel Super Heroes - Guardians of the Galaxy: The Thanos Threat, voiced again by Vanessa Marshall. This version is a member of the titular team.

Marvel Cinematic Universe

Zoe Saldaña portrays Gamora in media set in the Marvel Cinematic Universe. She first appears in the live-action film Guardians of the Galaxy (2014), before making subsequent appearances in the live-action films Guardians of the Galaxy Vol. 2 (2017) and Avengers: Infinity War (2018). Furthermore, Saldaña also portrays an alternate timeline version of Gamora in the live-action film Avengers: Endgame (2019) and will reprise the role in the upcoming live-action film Guardians of the Galaxy Vol. 3. Additionally, Ariana Greenblatt portrays a young Gamora in Infinity War while Cynthia McWilliams voices a different alternate timeline version in the Disney+ animated series What If...? episode "What If... the Watcher Broke His Oath?".

Video games
 Gamora appears as a playable character in Marvel: Avengers Alliance.
 Two incarnations of Gamora appear as playable characters Marvel Puzzle Quest.
 Gamora appears in Lego Marvel Super Heroes, voiced by Danielle Nicolet.
 Gamora appears as a playable character in Disney Infinity 2.0 voiced again by Nika Futterman.
 Gamora appears as a playable character in Marvel Contest of Champions.
 Gamora appears as a playable character in Marvel: Future Fight.
 Gamora appears as a playable character in Disney Infinity 3.0, voiced again by Nika Futterman.
 Gamora appears in Guardians of the Galaxy: The Telltale Series, voiced by Emily O'Brien.
 Gamora appears as a playable character in Marvel vs. Capcom: Infinite, voiced again by Vanessa Marshall.
 Gamora appears as a playable character in Marvel Strike Force.
 Gamora appears as a playable character in Marvel Powers United VR, voiced again by Vanessa Marshall.
 Gamora appears as a playable character in Marvel Ultimate Alliance 3: The Black Order, voiced again by Vanessa Marshall.
 Gamora appears in Marvel's Guardians of the Galaxy, voiced by Kimberly-Sue Murray.
 Gamora appears in Marvel Snap.

Toys
 Gamora received a figure in "The Classic Marvel Figurine Collection" in 2012. Her number in the series is 189.
 A Gamora figure was released as part of the "Marvel Legends" Guardians of the Galaxy film tie-in line.
 A figure of the comic book incarnation of Gamora was released in a Guardians of the Galaxy-themed Hasbro boxed set.

Collected editions

See also
Gamora (Marvel Cinematic Universe)

References

External links
 Gamora at Marvel.com
 
 
 

Characters created by Jim Starlin
Comics characters introduced in 1975
Female characters in film
Fictional characters with superhuman durability or invulnerability
Fictional swordfighters in comics
Fictional women soldiers and warriors
Guardians of the Galaxy characters
Marvel Comics aliens
Marvel Comics characters who can move at superhuman speeds
Marvel Comics characters with accelerated healing
Marvel Comics characters with superhuman strength
Marvel Comics extraterrestrial superheroes
Marvel Comics extraterrestrial supervillains
Marvel Comics female superheroes
Marvel Comics female supervillains
Marvel Comics film characters
Marvel Comics martial artists
Marvel Comics television characters